Nowotny is a surname. Common in Germany and Austria, it is a variant of the Czech and Slovak surname Novotný, which means "newcomer". The name may refer to:

 Chris Nowotny (1928–1989), German photographer
 Eva Nowotny (born 1944), Austrian diplomat
 Ewald Nowotny (born 1944), Austrian politician
 George E. Nowotny (born 1932), American politician
 Helga Nowotny (born 1937), Austrian sociologist
 Jens Nowotny (born 1974), German football player
 Karl Anton Nowotny (1904–1978), Austrian ethnographer
 Rita-Maria Nowotny (1925–2000), German actress
 Robert Nowotny (born 1974), Austrian beach volleyball player
 Stan Nowotny (born 1950), Australian football player
 Walter Nowotny (1920–1944), German fighter pilot

Fiction
 Waltraud Nowotny, a fictional character from Strike Witches

Other uses
 Jagdgeschwader 7 Nowotny, German jet fighter wing
 Kommando Nowotny, German jet fighter group

See also
 
 Novotný (surname)

References

Surnames of Czech origin